The Wuosthorn (2,815 m) is a mountain of the Albula Alps, located south of Davos in the canton of Graubünden. It lies north of the Bocktenhorn, on the range between the valleys of Sertig and Dischma.

References

External links
 Wuosthorn on Hikr

Mountains of Graubünden
Mountains of the Alps
Mountains of Switzerland
Two-thousanders of Switzerland
Davos